Senggi District is a district in Keerom Regency, Papua, Indonesia.

Villages
As of 2018, Senggi consists of 7 administrative villages (kampung). The indigenous Papuan languages spoken in each village are also listed below.

Elseng (:Elseng language speakers)
Senggi (:Viid language speakers)
Warlef (:Zorop language speakers)
Woslay
Usku (:Usku language speakers)
Waley
Namla (:Namla language speakers)

References

Districts of Papua (province)